The 62nd Writers Guild of America Awards honored the best film, television, and videogame writers of 2009. Winners were announced on February 20, 2010.

Nominees
Names in bold denote the winners.

Film

Best Adapted Screenplay
 Crazy Heart
 Julie & Julia
 Precious: Based on the novel "Push" by Sapphire
 Star Trek
 Up in the Air

Best Original Screenplay
 (500) Days of Summer
 Avatar
 The Hangover
 The Hurt Locker
 A Serious Man

Best Documentary Feature Screenplay
 Against the Tide – Richard Trank; based on original material written by Richard Trank and Rabbi Marvin Hier
 Capitalism: A Love Story – Michael Moore
 The Cove – Mark Monroe
 Earth Days – Robert Stone
 Good Hair – Chris Rock, Jeff Stilson, Lance Crouther, and Chuck Sklar
 Soundtrack for a Revolution – Bill Guttentag and Dan Sturman

Television

Dramatic Series

Comedy Series

New Series

Episodic Drama

Episodic Comedy

Long Form – Original

Long Form – Adaptation

Animation

Comedy/Variety (Including Talk) Series

Comedy/Variety – Music, Awards, Tributes – Specials

Daytime Serials

Children's

Episodic and Specials

Long Form or Special

Documentary

Current events

Other than Current Events

News

Regularly scheduled, bulletin, or breaking report

Analysis, Feature, or Commentary

Radio

Documentary
 2008 Year in Review – Written by Gail Lee; CBS

News – Regularly Scheduled or Breaking
 So Many Goodbyes – Written by Gail Lee; CBS Radio
 WCBS News Radio – Written by Robert Hawley; CBS Radio
 World News This Week − July 11, 2009 – Written by Darren Reynolds; ABC Radio

News – Analysis, Feature or Commentary
 Black History Month – Written by Arleen Lebe; CBS Radio
 End of Summer – Written by Duane Tollison; CBS Radio
 Farewells – Written by Gail Lee; CBS Radio
 Paul Harvey: An American Life – Written by Stu Chamberlain; ABC Radio

Promotional Writing and Graphic Animation

On-Air Promotion (Radio or Television)
 How I Learned To Stop Worrying and Love the Promo Process – Written by Michelle Straebler; WNBC
 "Vegas" (Dateline), "The Wanted" Promo, NBC Nightly News Promo, "Iran" (Dateline), "Cheat" (Dateline) – Written by Barry Fitzsimmons; NBC

Television Graphic Animation
 "Hudson Splashdown" (CBS Evening News with Katie Couric) – Written by David M. Rosen and Shannon L. Toma; CBS

Video Games

Videogame Writing
 Assassin's Creed II – Story by Corey May, Script Writers Corey May, Joshua Rubin, Jeffrey Yohalem; Ubisoft
 Call of Duty: Modern Warfare 2 – Written by Jesse Stern; Additional Writing Steve Fukuda; Story by Todd Alderman, Steve Fukuda, Mackey McCandlish, Zied Rieke, Jesse Stern, Jason West, Battlechatter Dialogue, and Sean Slayback; Activision
 Uncharted 2: Among Thieves – Written by Amy Hennig; Sony Computer Entertainment' Wet – Written by Duppy Demetrius and Bethesda Softworks
 X-Men Origins: Wolverine'' – Written by Marc Guggenheim; Activision

References

External links
 WGA.org

2009
W
Writers Guild of America
W
Writers Guild of America Awards
Writers Guild of America Awards
2009 in American cinema
2009 in American television
Writers Guild of America Awards